Mushroom-feeding Drosophila (mycophagous Drosophila) are a subset of Drosophila flies that have highly specific mushroom-breeding ecologies. Often these flies can tolerate toxic compounds from Amanita mushrooms.

Species groups 
 Drosophila testacea species group
 Drosophila quinaria species group
 Drosophila bizonata species group
 Some members of the Drosophila obscura species group

Sequenced genomes or transcriptomes 
 Drosophila guttifera
 Drosophila neotestacea
 Drosophila innubila
 Drosophila falleni
 Drosophila phalerata

Gallery

References

External links

 Diptera.info

Drosophila
Insect common names
Insect species groups